Miguel Sanz Sesma (born 16 September 1952 in Corella, Spain) is a conservative Spanish politician of the Navarrese People's Union (UPN) and the president of the autonomous community of Navarre from 1996 to 2011.

Biography
Originally a lecturer of primary education, Sanz later studied business administration at the University of Navarre. He served as the mayor of his hometown Corella from 1983 to 1987. He was also elected to the Parliament of Navarre in 1983 and served incessantly since that date. He was elected the vice-president of UPN in 1989 and became the vice-president of Navarre under UPN government of Juan Cruz Alli (1991–1995). He was elected the president of Navarre in 1996 and the chairman of UPN in 1997 until he was replaced by Yolanda Barcina, the mayor of Pamplona in 2009.

After eleven years in office, presidency of Sanz came under jeopardy after left wing and Basque nationalist parties won a majority in the Navarrese parliament in 2007. However, the Spanish Socialist Workers' Party reached an agreement with UPN and Sanz was re-elected as president (in coalition with the Democrats' Convergence of Navarre), whereas socialist Elena Torres Miranda became the president of the parliament. In an interview with El País, he declared that he does not have the intention to run at the Navarrese elections in 2011.

Sanz has been known as a fierce opponent of Basque nationalism as well as fiscal centrism, the latter stance having led to termination of UPN's fraternal party relationship with the People's Party and the reappearance of the People's Party of Navarre in 2008.

References

1952 births
Living people
Members of the 1st Parliament of Navarre
Members of the 2nd Parliament of Navarre
Members of the 3rd Parliament of Navarre
Members of the 4th Parliament of Navarre
Members of the 5th Parliament of Navarre
Members of the 6th Parliament of Navarre
Members of the 7th Parliament of Navarre
Municipal councillors in Navarre
Navarrese People's Union politicians
Politicians from Navarre
Presidents of the Government of Navarre
University of Navarra alumni
People from Tudela (comarca)